The FIBA Saporta Cup Finals MVP was an annual award that was given by the European-wide second-tier level professional club basketball competition, the FIBA Saporta Cup. It was given to the Most Valuable Player (MVP) of each season's FIBA Saporta Cup Finals.

FIBA Saporta Cup Finals MVPs
From the FIBA Saporta Cup 1995–96 season, to the 2001–02 season, an MVP of the FIBA Saporta Cup Finals was chosen.

See also
FIBA Saporta Cup
FIBA Saporta Cup Finals
FIBA Saporta Cup Finals Top Scorer
FIBA Saporta Cup Top Scorer
FIBA Saporta Cup Records
FIBA Festivals
FIBA EuroStars

References

External links
FIBA Saporta Cup @ FIBA Europe.com
FIBA Saporta Cup Winners 
FIBA Saporta Cup @ LinguaSport.com

Finals MVP
European basketball awards
Basketball most valuable player awards